The women's competition in the flyweight (– 48 kg) division was held on 17 September 2010.

Schedule

Medalists

Records

Results

New records

References
(Page 23) Start List
Results

- Women's 48 kg, 2010 World Weightlifting Championships
2010 in women's weightlifting